The 2020 Sioux Chief PowerPEX 200 was the 18th stock car race of the 2020 ARCA Menards Series, the tenth and final race of the 2020 Sioux Chief Showdown, and the fourth iteration of the event. The race was held on Saturday, September 26, 2020, in Memphis, Tennessee, at Memphis International Raceway, a  tri-oval short track. The race took the scheduled 200 laps to complete. At race's end, Ty Gibbs of Joe Gibbs Racing would hold off the field on the final restart with three to go to win his eighth career ARCA Menards Series win and his sixth and final win of the season. Meanwhile, second-place finisher, GMS Racing driver Sam Mayer, would narrowly hold off Gibbs by 5 points to win the inaugural Sioux Chief Showdown championship.

Background 

Memphis International Raceway (formerly known as Memphis Motorsports Park) is an auto racing park located near the Loosahatchie River in Shelby County, Tennessee, United States, just approximately ten miles south of Millington, and a few miles north of the city of Memphis. The facility opened in 1987 with a drag strip and 1.8-mile (2.9 km) road course. It includes a 3/4-mile tri-oval short track, built in 1998, which once hosted the NASCAR Xfinity Series and Camping World Truck Series, as well as an ASA Late Model Series race. The 4,400-foot (1,340 m) drag strip hosts events such as International Hot Rod Association (IHRA) World Finals and Nitro Jam, Professional Drag Racers Association (PDRA), HOT ROD Power Tour, Super Chevy Show, Fun Ford Series and Mega Mopar Action Series.

Entry list

Practice 
The only practice session was held on Saturday, September 26.

Qualifying 
Qualifying was held on Saturday, September 26, at 4:00 PM EST. Each driver would have two laps to set a fastest time; the fastest of the two would count as their official qualifying lap.

Full qualifying results

Race results

References 

2020 ARCA Menards Series
September 2020 sports events in the United States
2020 in sports in Tennessee
NASCAR races at Memphis International Raceway